International Institute of Hotel Management or IIHM is a hospitality and hotel management school with campuses in India at Goa,
Kolkata, Bangalore, Delhi, Pune, Ahmedabad, Jaipur, Hyderabad and international campuses at Bangkok and Samarkand. International Institute of Hotel Management was founded by Dr. Suborno Bose, Chief Mentor, and CEO of IndiSmart Group & IIHM.

Courses

International Institute of Hotel Management provides a bachelor's degree in Tourism from IGNOU.

Young Chef Olympiad
International Institute of Hotel Management organizes YCO or Young Chef Olympiad, a culinary Olympiad for Young Chefs of the world. Over 55 nations take part in The International Young Chef Olympiad.

IIHM University
International Institute Of Hotel Management is about to set up India's first Tourism University in Kolkata, West Bengal,  named IIHM University.

IIHM Park Street Metro
The International Institute of Hotel Management (IIHM) and Kolkata Metro Railway signed a memorandum of understanding on March 2 for the co-branding of the Park Street Metro station, which will henceforth be renamed IIHM Park Street Metro.

References 

IIHM Signs Historic MoU with Marriott Hotels India Ltd

External links 
 Young Chef Olympiad website



Hospitality schools in India
Universities and colleges in Kolkata
Universities in India
Educational institutions in India with year of establishment missing